Manasa Sarovara is a 1982 Kannada language Indian film directed by Puttanna Kanagal and starring Srinath, Padma Vasanthi and Ramakrishna. Padmavasanthi won the Karnataka State Award for Best Actress for her performance. The plot was reported to be influenced by George Bernard Shaw's 1913 play Pygmalion.

Plot
Dr. Anand is a middle-aged psychiatrist who realizes that his married life has no happiness or peace. Soon his wife leaves him. After returning to his village in an attempt to find peace and manage his estate, Anand meets Vasanthi on the road, stoning passersby. Seeking to understand her behavior, he meets her brother and finds out that Vasanthi has developed a deep hatred for men after their sister committed suicide, after being ditched by her boyfriend.

The family agrees to Anand's request to take Vasanthi away and cure her. The change in environment and loving care allow Vasanthi to gradually recover from her trauma. During the course of treatment, Dr. Anand ends up falling in love with her. When he is away to attend a seminar, his nephew arrives and Vasanthi falls in love with the nephew. Upon his return, when he finds this out, Dr. Anand is heartbroken. He eventually loses his own sanity, and is left in a state akin to that of Vasanthi when he first met her.

Cast
 Srinath as Dr. Anand
 Ramakrishna as Santhosh
 Padmavasanthi as Vasanthi
 Jai Jagdish
 Chandrashekhar
 Rekha Rao
 Vaishali Kasaravalli

Soundtrack

Awards
 Karnataka State Film Awards 1982-83 - Best Actress - Padmavasanthi

Sequel
The sequel for the film has been made into a television series and aired on Udaya TV from 26 February 2018. The lead actors from the film reprised their roles in the series.

References

External links
 
 Songs Download, All MP3 Songs, Raaga.com All Songs

1982 films
1980s Kannada-language films
Indian drama films
Films directed by Puttanna Kanagal
Films scored by Vijaya Bhaskar